Zálesie may refer to:

Zálesie, Kežmarok District, Slovakia
Zálesie, Senec District, Slovakia

See also
Zalesie (disambiguation)
Zalesye

pl:Zalesie